The 2000–01 Highland Football League was won by Cove Rangers. Fort William finished bottom. Elgin City & Peterhead left the Highland League to join the Scottish Football League, reducing the number of teams from 16 to 14 this season.

Table

Highland Football League seasons
5
Scot